Illifaut (Gallo: Ilifaut) is a commune in the Côtes-d'Armor department of Brittany in northwestern France.

Population

The inhabitants of Illifaut are known in French as illifautais.

See also
Communes of the Côtes-d'Armor department

References

Communes of Côtes-d'Armor